The Federation of Independent Trade Unions can refer to:

 Federation of Independent Trade Unions and Non-Governmental Organisations in Trinidad and Tobago
 Federation of Independent Trade Unions of Russia, an active federation
 Federation of Independent Trade Unions (South Africa), a former federation